The following is a list of Singaporean electoral divisions from 1976 to 1980 that served as constituencies that elected Members of Parliament (MPs) to the 4th Parliament of Singapore in the 1976 Singaporean general elections. The number of seats in Parliament had increased by 4 to 69 seats. Since the 1968 Singaporean general election, no opposition candidate had been elected into Parliament under the People's Action Party (PAP) government until the 1981 by-election in Anson.

Changes
The abolished constituencies were:
Bras Basah. Merged with River Valley. Ho See Beng therefore moved house from Bras Basah to Khe Bong (just reflecting new development)
Crawford. Merged with Kampong Glam. Ang Kok Peng therefore moved house from Crawford to Buona Vista (just reflecting new development)
Hong Lim. Merged with Telok Ayer. Lee Khoon Choy therefore moved house from Hong Lim to Braddell Heights (just reflecting new development)
Kampong Kapor. Merged with Jalan Besar. Yeo Toon Chia therefore moved house from Kampong Kapor to Ang Mo Kio (just reflecting new development)
Sepoy Lines. Merged with Tanjong Pagar. Wee Toon Boon resigned.
Stamford. Merged with Rochore. Andrew Fong therefore moved house from Stamford to Kampong Chai Chee (just in view of the new Bedok constituency)

The ten new constituencies were:
Ang Mo Kio (from Nee Soon)
Bedok (from Siglap)
Boon Lay (from Jurong)
Braddell Heights (from Paya Lebar, Serangoon Gardens, Thomson and Upper Serangoon)
Brickworks (from Leng Kee & Pasir Panjang)
Buona Vista (from Queenstown)
Khe Bong (from Kuo Chuan & Toa Payoh)
Kolam Ayer (from Geylang West, Jalan Besar and Potong Pasir)
Marine Parade (from Katong and land reclamation)
Radin Mas (merged part of Henderson & Telok Blangah)

Constituencies

References

External links 
 

1976